Kirill Kulemin (born 13 October 1980) is a Russian rugby union player currently playing for USA Perpignan in the Pro D2. Born in Moscow, he previously played rugby league for Dynamo Moscow and his talents were noticed playing in a Challenge Cup match against professional Super League teams. His position is at lock or in the forwards. Kulemin left London Welsh to join Sale Sharks for the 2013/14 season. After a spell with Sale Sharks, it was confirmed Kulemin will return to France to join USA Perpignan, who were relegated to the Pro D2.

He had 33 caps for Russia, from 2006 to 2014, scoring 4 tries, 20 points on aggregate. Kulemin also played for Russia at the 2000 Rugby League World Cup, playing in the match against Australia, He also played other two matches in 2003, one year before switching to union. He missed the 2011 Rugby World Cup due to an injury sustained in Wales: he was tackled by two or three players, and as a result of an unsuccessful movement, Kulemin suffered a knee injury. Two days later, he had his knee operated, which theoretically would allow him to play, but subsequent complications ruled out his participation at the tournament.

Notes

External links
Kirill Kulemin Official Website

Statistics at rugbyleagueproject.org

1980 births
Living people
Expatriate rugby union players in England
Expatriate rugby union players in France
Rugby league second-rows
Rugby union locks
Russia international rugby union players
Russia national rugby league team players
Russian expatriate rugby union players
Russian expatriate sportspeople in England
Russian expatriate sportspeople in France
Russian rugby league players
Russian rugby union players
Sportspeople from Moscow
Sale Sharks players